This is a list of Australian Lacrosse national champions.

Trophy
Men's National Champions: Garland McHarg Trophy

Women's National Champions: Joy Parker Cup

* For the Australian Lacrosse League that ran from 2004 to 2007, the venue refers to that of the championship game

Total Championships:
Men's
 Victoria: 33
 Western Australia: 17
 South Australia: 13
Women's
 South Australia: 32
 Victoria: 20
 Western Australia: 6

See also

 Lacrosse in Australia
 Lacrosse Australia

References

National League
Australia
Lacrosse